is a town located in Miyagi Prefecture, Japan. , the town had an estimated population of 	23,618, and a population density of 950persons per km² in 9,925 households.

Geography
Ōgawara is located in south-central Miyagi Prefecture, in the Tōhoku region of northern Japan. The Shiroishi River runs through the town.

Neighboring municipalities
Miyagi Prefecture
Kakuda
Shiroishi
Shibata
Murata
Zaō

Climate
Ōgawara has a humid climate (Köppen climate classification Cfa) characterized by mild summers and cold winters.  The average annual temperature in Ōgawara is 12.5 °C. The average annual rainfall is 1272 mm with September as the wettest month. The temperatures are highest on average in August, at around 24.9 °C, and lowest in January, at around 1.4 °C.

Demographics
Per Japanese census data, the population of Ōgawara has steadily increased over the past 60 years.

History
The area of present-day Ōgawara was part of ancient Mutsu Province, and was part of the holdings of Sendai Domain under the Edo period Tokugawa shogunate. The town of Ōgawara  was established on April 1, 1889 with the establishment of the post-Meiji restoration modern municipalities system. The town annexed the neighboring village of Kanegase on September 30, 1955. However, an effort to merge Ōgawara with the neighboring towns of Shibata and Murata in 2002 was rejected by the town assembly in 2004.

Government
Ōgawara has a mayor-council form of government with a directly elected mayor and a unicameral town council of 15 members. Ōgawara, collectively with the other municipalities in Shibata District contributes two seats to the Miyagi Prefectural legislature. In terms of national politics, the town is part of Miyagi 3rd district of the lower house of the Diet of Japan.

Economy
The economy of Ōgawara is largely based on agriculture.

Education
Ōgawara has three public elementary schools and two public middle schools operated by the town government, and two public high schools operated by the Miyagi Prefectural Board of Education. The prefecture also operates one special education school for the handicapped.

Transportation

Railway
 East Japan Railway Company (JR East) - Tōhoku Main Line

Highway

References

External links

Official Website 

 
Towns in Miyagi Prefecture